Plastic Galaxy: The Story of Star Wars Toys, or simply Plastic Galaxy, is a 2014 documentary film directed by Brian Stillman about Kenner's action figures based on the Star Wars franchise.

Release
The film was released on DVD on January 14, 2014. It began streaming on Vimeo on October 3, 2014. It was also released on iTunes in 2014.

Reception
Film Threat described the film as, "well researched and fun to watch," and praised the production design and DVD of the film, but criticized some of the "drama," describing it as, "silly." Jacob Tender of Substream Magazine gave the film five out of five stars, saying "[The film] is a must-have for fans of Star Wars and collectors alike." Writing for Flickering Myth, Amy Richau gave it four out of four stars, saying "...the film is essentially a love letter to Star Wars toys – and a very enjoyable love letter at that." Ian Gormely of Exclaim! gave it a five out of ten star rating, and described it as, "niche even by the extreme standards of Star Wars."

References

External links

 

2014 films
2014 documentary films
Films about toys
Kickstarter-funded documentaries
Star Wars documentaries
Direct-to-video documentary films
2010s English-language films